Tkachuk, Tkaczuk, or Tkatchuk  (Ukrainian: Ткачук) is a common Ukrainian surname in Ukraine and the Ukrainian diaspora. The name in Ukrainian stands for the name of occupation, weaver. The names that end in -chuk or -czuk are of the western Ukrainian origin. Notable people with the surname include:

People

Tkachuk
 Anastasiya Tkachuk (born 1993), Ukrainian runner
 Anatoly Tkachuk (born 1937), Ukrainian rower
 Andriy Tkachuk (born 1987), Ukrainian footballer
 Bordan Tkachuk (born 1954), British business executive
 Brady Tkachuk (born 1999), American ice hockey player
 David Tkachuk (born 1945), Canadian Senator
 Denis Tkachuk (born 1989), Russian footballer
 Grant Tkachuk (born 1968), Canadian professional ice hockey player
 Keith Tkachuk (born 1972), American professional ice hockey player
 Kevin Tkachuk (born 1976), Canadian rugby player
 Maryna Tkachuk (born 1964), Ukrainian historian and academic
 Matthew Tkachuk (born 1997), American ice hockey player
 Oleksandr Tkachuk (born 1985), Ukrainian footballer
 Roman Tkachuk (born 1987), Russian footballer
 Serhiy Tkachuk, (born 1992), Ukrainian-born Kazakhstani footballer
 Yevhen Tkachuk (born 1991), Ukrainian footballer
 Yuriy Tkachuk (born 1995), Ukrainian footballer
 Valeri Tkachuk (born 1963), Russian footballer
 Vasyl Tkachuk (1916–1944), 20th century Ukrainian poet and activist
 Viktoriya Tkachuk (born 1994), Ukrainian runner
 Vsevolod Tkachuk (born 1946), Soviet and Russian chemist and academic

Alternative spellings
 Daniel Tkaczuk (born 1979), Canadian ice hockey player
 Irina Tkatchuk (born 1983), Russian figure skater
 Mihail Tcaciuk (born 1971), Ukrainian and Moldovan footballer
 Walt Tkaczuk (born 1947), German-born Canadian ice hockey player

See also
 
 Tkach
 Tkachenko
 Takács, Hungarian-language cognate

Occupational surnames
Ukrainian-language surnames